Brahim El Bahraoui (born 30 July 1992) is a professional football player who currently plays for RS Berkane.

References

1992 births
Living people
People from Safi, Morocco
Moroccan footballers
Fath Union Sport players
Rapide Oued Zem players
Olympic Club de Safi players
Association football forwards
2020 African Nations Championship players
Morocco A' international footballers
RS Berkane players